The Pontifical College Josephinum is a Roman Catholic seminary and private university in Columbus, Ohio. It was founded by Joseph Jessing in 1888 and was granted the status of a Pontifical College in 1892 by Pope Leo XIII, making it the only pontifical seminary in North America. Although the college is accredited by the Higher Learning Commission (HLC) and Association of Theological Schools in the United States and Canada (ATS), both accreditors placed the institution on probation in 2022 for issues including problems in strategic planning, internal leadership structures, and declining enrollment.

History

Background and foundation

Joseph Jessing emigrated from Germany to the United States in 1867, was ordained to the priesthood in 1870, and assigned to Sacred Heart Church in Pomeroy. Within his first year at Sacred Heart, the parish purchased a house next door to serve as an orphanage for twelve local boys, supported in part by a German-language newspaper that Jessing wrote. The newspaper and orphanage, known as the St. Joseph Orphan Asylum, grew so rapidly that five years later, in 1876, Jessing moved both the orphanage and the printing operations of the Waisenfreund to Columbus for greater railroad access. The facility, located at the intersection of Main and Seventeenth Streets in Columbus gave both a Catholic education and training in the trades to the young men in its care.

In October of 1888, prompted both by the desire of some of the orphan boys to study for the priesthood and the need of German-speaking Catholics to be ministered to by German-speaking priests, Jessing founded the Collegium Josephinum, and its first class of 23 men began formation at the Columbus site.

As those first students progressed through the seminary program, the institution initially provided six years of primary education ("minor seminary," four years of high school and two years of college/pre-theology) and six years of secondary seminary education ("major seminary," another two years of college/pre-theology and four years of theology/ seminary). Father Jessing lived to see the first class of six seminarians ordained to the priesthood in June 1899 but he died less than six months later in November of that same year.

Pontifical status
To make sure that the fledgling institution would continue after his death, Father Jessing asked that it be placed under the protection of the Holy See. Pope Leo XIII granted the request in 1892, thus making the new institution, the Pontifical College Josephinum, the only pontifical seminary outside of Italy. From that time to the present, the institution has been under the direction of the Congregation for Catholic Education, with the Apostolic Nuncio to the United States as its Chancellor.  The college is governed by a board of trustees.

Relocation to present campus
The new complex was designed by architect Frank A. Ludewig and cost $1.5 million dollars to construct.

The academic structure of the seminary changed over time during the 1940s and 1950s from the "six-six" format to four years of high school, four years of college, and four years of theology/seminary (though the distinctions were gradual and unclear). Reflecting the German origins of its founder and its service to the German-speaking community, the seminary high school and college held almost all classes in German until the influx of non-German speaking students made this no longer practical. The first official college commencement occurred in June 1953; the college and recreation buildings were dedicated in 1958; and the high school closed in 1967 due to a decline in the number of applicants.

For the first few decades of its existence, the seminary focused its work on educating priests to work with the large population of German immigrants in the United States. The Josephinum was incorporated in Ohio in 1894; its Constitution was first approved by Pope Pius XI in 1938 and was most recently revised and approved by the Congregation for Catholic Education in 1996.

Modernization and increasing international focus

In the years after World War I, the focus of the seminary shifted away from its original mission of meeting the spiritual needs of German-speaking Catholics to a wider mission of preparing priests for dioceses throughout the United States that lacked their own seminary. With the advent of the Second Vatican Council in 1962, the Church took on a more outward-looking and evangelical orientation. It was only natural that seminaries like The Josephinum also become increasingly involved in outreach and ministry work in their local communities. This trend continues today, along with many other initiatives.

Steven P. Beseau assumed leadership of the Pontifical College Josephinum on October 1, 2019. Josephinum alumni serve the Church in 48 states and 22 foreign countries. The Josephinum continues to prepare priests for U.S. dioceses that do not have their own seminaries, missionary areas of the United States, including regions of the U.S. with growing Hispanic communities and finally, dioceses around the world in need of help with the education of their seminarians.

List of Rectors 

 Joseph Jessing (1888-1899)

 John J. Soentgerath (1900-1919)

 Joseph Och (1919-1932)

 Henry J. Grimmelsman (1932-1944)

 Adrian F. Brandehoff (1945-1952)

 Paul A. Gieringer (1952-1962)

 Ralph A. Thompson (1962-1967)

 Thomas P. Campbell (1967-1974)

 Frank A. Mouch (1974-1984)

 Dennis F.  Sheehan (1986-1989)

 Blase J. Cupich (1989-1996)

 Thomas J. Olmsted (1997-1999)

 Earl A. Boyea  (2000-2002)

 Paul J. Langsfeld  (2003-2009)

 James A. Wehner (2009-2012)

 Christopher J. Schreck (2012-2019)

 Steven P. Beseau (2019-present)

Accreditation and certifications
Led by a decades long effort by its most significant graduate and 20th century leader, Leonard J. Fick, the Josephinum was accredited by the Higher Learning Commission (HLC), an affiliate of the North Central Association of Colleges and Secondary Schools in 1976. The Josephinum has been accredited by the Association of Theological Schools in the United States and Canada (ATS) since 1970. The seminary also holds a Certificate of Authorization from the Ohio Board of Regents.

In March of 2022, the ATS issued a warning to the institution, as did the HLC in June of the same year. Issues include problems in strategic planning, internal leadership structures, and declining enrollment in the college.

See also
 Statue of Christopher Columbus, originally commissioned for the school

References

External links 

 Official website

 
Catholic seminaries in the United States
Seminaries and theological colleges in Ohio
Catholic universities and colleges in Ohio
Universities and colleges in Columbus, Ohio
Educational institutions established in 1888
Worthington, Ohio
Pontifical universities
Roman Catholic Diocese of Columbus
1888 establishments in Ohio
Saint Joseph (husband of Mary)